A general election was held in the United Kingdom on 6 May 2010 and all 59 seats in Scotland were contested. The election result in Scotland was unusual in that there wasn't any change of seats from the 2005 general election, although the Labour Party took back two seats that it had lost in by-elections. This was the most recent general election at which the Labour Party won a majority of seats and plurality of votes in Scotland.

Contesting parties

Since 2005, the Scottish National Party had come first in the 2007 Scottish Parliament election as well as the 2009 European election. They had also won the Glasgow East by-election in 2008, which was one of the safest Labour seats in the UK. This boosted the party's confidence and the party's leader Alex Salmond set the ambitious target of 20 seats in the general election. Salmond himself was standing down as an MP because he wanted to focus more on his job as First Minister of Scotland. In the election, the party only increased their share of the vote by 2.3% and had their number of seats reduced to six after being overwhelmingly defeated in the Glasgow East constituency.

The Scottish Labour Party had held the majority of seats in Scotland in every general election since the 1960s. This is usually attributed to the North-South divide in British politics, where Scotland and the North of England tend to return mostly Labour MP's whereas the South of England tends to vote mostly for the Conservatives. Many prominent government officials were representing Scottish constituencies, such as the Prime Minister Gordon Brown and the Chancellor Alistair Darling. In the election, the Labour Party in Scotland increased its share of the vote by 2.5% and re-gained the Glasgow East and Dunfermline and West Fife constituencies giving them 41 out of 59 seats in Scotland.

The Scottish Conservative Party had not held the majority of Scottish seats in a general election since 1955 and it lost all eleven of its seats in the election of 1997. Since 2001, the party had only held one Westminster seat in Scotland. In 2005, following the re-organisation of Scottish constituencies, that seat was Dumfriesshire, Clydesdale and Tweeddale, a mostly rural constituency near the Scottish borders. However, the party had 11 target seats within Scotland for the election and party officials such as William Hague had predicted a 'Tory breakthrough' for Scotland. Following the election, the Conservative vote in Scotland increased by roughly 1% but with only the 1 seat being retained.

During the 2005 election, the Scottish Liberal Democrats achieved 11 Scottish seats in Westminster and saw this figure increased to 12 following the Dunfermline and West Fife by-election in 2006. Two former Liberal Democrat leaders, Charles Kennedy and Menzies Campbell represent Scottish constituencies. In the election, the Liberal Democrat vote fell in Scotland and the party was once again left with 11 seats.

Minor parties such as the UK Independence Party, the British National Party and the Scottish Green Party all contested more Scottish seats than they did in the 2005 election. The Socialist Workers Party and Solidarity (a splinter group of the Scottish Socialists) took part in the Trade Unionist and Socialist Coalition for the election. The Scottish Socialist Party had contested all of the Scottish constituencies in 2005 but because of party splits, it fielded only 10 candidates for the 2010 election.

If proportional representation had been used, and hypothetically there was no change in voter behaviour, then the Labour Party would have had 25 seats, the SNP would have had 12, the Liberal Democrats would have had 11 and the Conservatives would have had 10.

Campaign events

 9 April – The Labour Party candidate for Moray, Stuart Maclennan, was sacked after making offensive comments on his Twitter page. These included insulting politicians such as David Cameron, Nick Clegg, John Bercow and Diane Abbott and also referring to the elderly as 'coffin dodgers' and voters in the North of Scotland as teuchters.
 12 April – Prime Minister Gordon Brown asks the Queen to dissolve parliament, thus triggering the election.
 20 April – The first of three televised Scottish Leader's debates takes place.
 27 April – The Conservative candidate for North Ayrshire and Arran, Philip Lardner was expelled from his party and relieved from his job as a primary school teacher after making comments on his blog that homosexuality was 'not normal'. This occurred on 27 April 2010, which was too late to remove his name from the ballot paper and subsequently he still read as the Conservative & Unionist candidate.
 28 April – The SNP failed to sue the BBC for excluding them from the televised leader's debates, claiming that the BBC had breached its rules on impartiality by excluding the SNP.
 6 May – Polling day across the United Kingdom of Great Britain and Northern Ireland. The following day, a hung parliament is declared, where no party holds an overall majority in the House of Commons.

Scottish Leader's debates

In correspondence with the main Leader's debates, featuring David Cameron, Gordon Brown and Nick Clegg, three televised debates were broadcast with representatives from the four main parties in Scotland. The first debate was broadcast on STV on 20 April, the second on Sky News on 25 April and the third on BBC One Scotland on 2 May.

The representatives from each of the main parties were:

 Scottish Labour Party – Jim Murphy, Secretary of State for Scotland, MP for East Renfrewshire
 Scottish Conservative Party – David Mundell, Shadow Secretary of State for Scotland, MP for Dumfriesshire, Clydesdale and Tweeddale
 Scottish Liberal Democrats – Alistair Carmichael, Liberal Democrat Spokesman on Northern Ireland and Scotland, MP for Orkney and Shetland
 Scottish National Party – Angus Robertson, SNP leader at Westminster, MP for Moray

Target seats

Labour Party

Scottish National Party

Liberal Democrats

Conservative Party

Overall results

1 Philip Lardner, the Conservative candidate for North Ayrshire and Arran was disowned by the Conservative Party for comments he posted on his website, calling homosexuality 'abnormal'. It was too late for him to be replaced and he still read as the Scottish Conservative & Unionist Party candidate on the ballot paper.

Votes summary

Results by constituency

Winning party in each constituency is marked in bold.

Superlatives

Labour Party
 Highest share of vote – Glasgow North East, 68.3% of vote
 Lowest share of vote – Berwickshire, Roxburgh and Selkirk, 10.2% of vote

Scottish National Party
 Highest share of vote – Na h-Eileanan an Iar, 45.7% of vote
 Lowest share of vote – Edinburgh South, 7.7% of vote

Liberal Democrats
 Highest share of vote – Orkney and Shetland, 62.0% of vote
 Lowest share of vote – Glasgow East, 5.0% of vote

Conservative Party
 Highest share of vote – Dumfriesshire, Clydesdale and Tweeddale, 38.0% of vote
 Lowest share of vote – Na h-Eileanan an Iar, 4.4% of vote

Minor parties' highest shares
 UK Independence Party – Orkney and Shetland, 6.3% of vote
 Scottish Green Party – Edinburgh East, 5.1% of vote
 British National Party – Banff and Buchan, 2.6% of vote

References

Scotland
United Kingdom General Election Results in Scotland, 2010
2010s elections in Scotland
2010